Glen Sochasky (born 28 November 1956) is a Venezuelan former swimmer who competed in the 1976 Summer Olympics.

References

1956 births
Living people
Venezuelan male swimmers
Venezuelan male freestyle swimmers
Male breaststroke swimmers
Olympic swimmers of Venezuela
Swimmers at the 1976 Summer Olympics
Swimmers at the 1979 Pan American Games
Swimmers at the 1983 Pan American Games
Pan American Games bronze medalists for Venezuela
Pan American Games medalists in swimming
Central American and Caribbean Games gold medalists for Venezuela
Competitors at the 1974 Central American and Caribbean Games
Competitors at the 1982 Central American and Caribbean Games
Central American and Caribbean Games medalists in swimming
Medalists at the 1983 Pan American Games
20th-century Venezuelan people
21st-century Venezuelan people